The Seven Sisters of Renvyle were Medieval Irish people, said to be the daughters of a King of Leinster, or a chief of Omey Island. They preached along the coast of Conmhaícne Mara, lending their names to holy wells at Renvyle, Cleggan, Aillebrack, Doon Hill, Mweenish Island and a cursing stone. Anthony Previté believes that they finally settled on Mason Island.

The medieval church at Renvyle Point, Teampaill na Seacht nInion, is dedicated to them. It is said to have been built in thanks by a king for the cures his seven daughters received from the waters of a nearby well. Grace O'Malley at one point lived in a nearby castle.

See also

 Scaithin
 Ríoch
 Ceannanach
 Mathias of Inis Ní

References

 A Guide to Connemara's Early Christian Sites, Anthony Previté, Oughterard, 2008. 

People from County Galway
Medieval Irish saints
People of Conmaicne Mara